Prince Pyotr Mikhailovich Volkonsky  , tr.) was an Imperial Russian military commander, General-Field Marshal (1843), Adjutant General to Alexander I, member of the State Council (1821).

Biography
Pyotr Volkonsky was born in St. Petersburg in 1776. Volkonsky participated in the plot to remove Paul I from the throne and became one of the closest advisors to Alexander I. He commanded the Russian troops in the Battle of Austerlitz.

He was Chief of Staff of the Acting Army from December 1812 and Chief of General Staff (1815-1823). Resigned after a conflict with the War Minister Count Aleksey Arakcheyev.

He was an Ambassador to the coronation of Charles X of France in 1824. Afterwards, he was Minister of Imperial Court and Properties between 1826 and 1852.

The mineral volkonskoite was named in honor of him in 1831.

References

External links
 The ancestors and descendants Serene Highness Prince Pyotr Mikhailovich Volkonsky

Notes
  S. Yu. Rychkov-Map depot and quantermaster unit on the eve of Patriotic war of 1812.The Journal of Military History (Voyenno-Istoricheskiy Zhurnal). April 2006,№ 4, p. 35-40
 Almagro (1843) notice sur le familles principales de la Russie

1776 births
1852 deaths
Pyotr Mikhailovich
Russian commanders of the Napoleonic Wars
Field marshals of Russia
Members of the State Council (Russian Empire)
Military personnel from Saint Petersburg
Recipients of the Order of St. George of the Third Degree
Honorary Knights Grand Cross of the Order of the Bath